Bradley Davis (born July 31, 1984), professionally known by his stage name DJ B-Do, is an American Record producer affiliated with UGK. He is a member of hip hop duo Da Underdawgz with fellow rapper Young T.O.E., brought together by the late Pimp C.

Biography
Bradley Davis, born and raised in Port Arthur, has played instruments since he was two years of age. Being Pimp C's protégé, he made his first appearance as a featured artist and record producer on the song "Grind Hard", which also featured Young T.O.E., from UGK's self-titled studio album Underground Kingz, released in 2007. This led Pimp C to create a duo between Davis and Young T.O.E. called Da Underdawgz. In 2008 Davis was featured in music video for Lupe Fiasco's single "Hip Hop Saved My Life" as the main character. In 2009, Davis produced two tracks, "Purse Come First" and "Used to Be", from UGK's final album UGK 4 Life together with Pimp C, and appeared on E.S.G.'s projects Digital Dope: The Reintroduction and Everyday Street Gangsta. Davis produced Bun B's 2010 single "Countin' Money" from his third solo studio album Trill OG, and appeared on his mentor's first and second posthumous solo releases of The Naked Soul of Sweet Jones and Still Pimping along with his bandmate Young T.O.E. Davis has his production credit on the song "I'm What Dat Iz" from Lil' O's 2011 Grind Hard, Pray Harder album. Da Underdawgz self-released their first street album titled The 1st One Is for Pimp in 2012, which featured contributions from UGK, E.S.G., Chamillionaire, Killa Kyleon, Young Buck and Z-Ro among others.

Discography

 Da Underdawgz – The 1st One Is for Pimp (2012)

Guest appearances

Production credits

References

External links

1984 births
Living people
Hip hop record producers
African-American musicians
Record producers from Texas
People from Port Arthur, Texas
21st-century African-American people
20th-century African-American people